Wernicke encephalopathy (WE), also Wernicke's encephalopathy, or wet brain is the presence of neurological symptoms caused by biochemical lesions of the central nervous system after exhaustion of B-vitamin reserves, in particular thiamine (vitamin B1). The condition is part of a larger group of thiamine deficiency disorders that includes beriberi, in all its forms, and alcoholic Korsakoff syndrome. When it occurs simultaneously with alcoholic Korsakoff syndrome it is known as Wernicke–Korsakoff syndrome.

Classically, Wernicke encephalopathy is characterised by a triad of symptoms: ophthalmoplegia, ataxia, and confusion. Around 10% of patients exhibit all three features, and other symptoms may also be present. While it is commonly regarded as a condition peculiar to malnourished people with alcohol misuse, it can be caused by a variety of diseases.
It is treated with thiamine supplementation, which can lead to improvement of the symptoms and often complete resolution, particularly in those where alcohol misuse is not the underlying cause. Often other nutrients also need to be replaced, depending on the cause; however medical literature notes the importance of managing the condition in a timely fashion to avoid worsening symptoms.

Wernicke encephalopathy may be present in the general population with a prevalence of around 2%, and is considered underdiagnosed; probably, many cases are in patients who do not have commonly-associated symptoms.

Signs and symptoms
The classic triad of symptoms found in Wernicke encephalopathy is:
 ophthalmoplegia (later expanded to other eye movement disorders, most commonly affecting the lateral rectus muscle. Lateral nystagmus is most commonly seen although lateral rectus palsy, usually bilateral, may be seen).
 ataxia (later expanded to imbalance or any cerebellar signs)
 confusion (later expanded to other mental changes. Has 82% incidence in diagnosis cases)

However, in actuality, only a small percentage of patients experience all three symptoms, and the full triad occurs more frequently among those who have overused alcohol. 

Also a much more diverse range of symptoms has been found in patients with this condition, including:
 pupillary changes, retinal hemorrhage, papilledema, impaired vision and hearing, vision loss
 hearing loss,
 fatigability, apathy, irritability, drowsiness, psycho and/or motor slowing
 dysphagia, blush, sleep apnea, epilepsy and stupor
 lactic acidosis
 memory impairment, amnesia, depression, psychosis
 hypothermia, polyneuropathy, hyperhidrosis.

Although hypothermia is usually diagnosed with a body temperature of 35 °C / 95° Fahrenheit, or less, incipient cooling caused by deregulation in the central nervous system (CNS) needs to be monitored because it can promote the development of an infection. The patient may report feeling cold, followed by mild chills, cold skin, moderate pallor, tachycardia, hypertension, tremor or piloerection. External warming techniques are advised to prevent hypothermia.

Among the frequently altered functions are the cardio circulatory. There may be tachycardia, dyspnea, chest pain, orthostatic hypotension, changes in heart rate and blood pressure. The lack of thiamine sometimes affects other major energy consumers, the myocardium, and also patients may have developed cardiomegaly. Heart failure with lactic acidosis syndrome has been observed. Cardiac abnormalities are an aspect of the WE, which was not included in the traditional approach, and are not classified as a separate disease.
Infections have been pointed out as one of the most frequent triggers of death in WE. Furthermore, infections are usually present in pediatric cases.

In the last stage other symptoms may occur: hyperthermia, increased muscle tone, spastic paralysis, choreic dyskinesias and coma.

Because of the frequent involvement of heart, eyes and peripheral nervous system, several authors prefer to call it Wernicke disease rather than simply encephalopathy.

Early symptoms are nonspecific, and it has been stated that WE may present nonspecific findings. In Wernicke Korsakoff's syndrome some single symptoms are present in about one-third.

Location of the lesion
Depending on the location of the brain lesion different symptoms are more frequent:
 Brainstem tegmentum. - Ocular: pupillary changes. Extraocular muscle palsy;  gaze palsy: nystagmus.
 Hypothalamus.  Medulla: dorsal nuc. of vagus. - Autonomic dysfunction: temperature; cardiocirculatory; respiratory.
 Medulla: vestibular region. Cerebellum. - Ataxia.
 Dorsomedial nuc. of thalamus. Mammillary bodies. - Amnestic syndrome for recent memory.
Mamillary lesion are characteristic-small petechial hemorrhages are found.
 Diffuse cerebral dysfunction.- Altered cognition: global confusional state.
 Brainstem: periaqueductal gray.- Reduction of consciousness
 Hypothalamic lesions may also affect the immune system, which is known in people who consume excessive amounts of alcohol, causing dysplasias and infections.

Korsakoff syndrome
Korsakoff syndrome, characterised by memory impairment, confabulation, confusion and personality changes, has a strong and recognised link with WE. A very high percentage of patients with Wernicke–Korsakoff syndrome also have peripheral neuropathy, and many people who consume excess alcohol have this neuropathy without other neurologic signs or symptoms. Korsakoff's occurs much more frequently in WE due to chronic alcoholism. It is uncommon among those who do not consume excessive amounts of alcohol. Up to 80% of WE patients who misuse alcohol develop Korsakoff's syndrome. In Korsakoff's, is usually observed atrophy of the thalamus and the mammillary bodies, and frontal lobe involvement.  In a study, half of Wernicke-Korsakoff cases had good recovery from the amnesic state, which may take from 2 months to 10 years.

Risk factors 
Wernicke encephalopathy has classically been thought of as a disease solely of people who drink excessive amounts of alcohol, but it is also found in the chronically undernourished, and in recent years had been discovered post bariatric surgery. Without being exhaustive, the documented causes of Wernicke encephalopathy have included:
 pancreatitis, liver dysfunction, chronic diarrhea, celiac disease, Crohn's disease, uremia, thyrotoxicosis
 vomiting, hyperemesis gravidarum, malabsorption, gastrointestinal surgery or diseases
 incomplete parenteral nutrition, starvation/fasting
 chemotherapy, renal dialysis, diuretic therapy, stem cell/marrow transplantation
 cancer, AIDS,  Creutzfeldt–Jakob disease, febrile infections
 this disease may even occur in some people with normal, or even high blood thiamine levels, are people with deficiencies in intracellular transport of this vitamin. Selected genetic mutations, including presence of the X-linked transketolase-like 1 gene, SLC19A2 thiamine transporter protein mutations, and the aldehyde dehydrogenase-2 gene, which may predispose to alcohol use disorder. The APOE epsilon-4 allele, involved in Alzheimer's disease, may increase the chance of developing neurological symptoms.

Pathophysiology
Thiamine deficiency and errors of thiamine metabolism are believed to be the primary cause of Wernicke encephalopathy. Thiamine, also called B1, helps to break down glucose. Specifically, it acts as an essential coenzyme to the TCA cycle and the pentose phosphate shunt. Thiamine is first metabolised to its more active form, thiamine diphosphate (TDP), before it is used. The body only has 2–3 weeks of thiamine reserves, which are readily exhausted without intake, or if depletion occurs rapidly, such as in chronic inflammatory states or in diabetes. Thiamine is involved in:
 Metabolism of carbohydrates, releasing energy.
 Production of neurotransmitters including glutamic acid and GABA.
 Lipid metabolism, necessary for myelin production.
 Amino acid modification. Probably linked to the production of taurine, of great cardiac importance.

Neuropathology
The primary neurological-related injury caused by thiamine deficiency in WE is three-fold: oxidative damage, mitochondrial injury leading to apoptosis, and directly stimulating a pro-apoptotic pathway. Thiamine deficiency affects both neurons and astrocytes, glial cells of the brain. Thiamine deficiency alters the glutamate uptake of astrocytes, through changes in the expression of astrocytic glutamate transporters EAAT1 and EAAT2, leading to excitotoxicity. Other changes include those to the GABA transporter subtype GAT-3, GFAP, glutamine synthetase, and the Aquaporin 4 channel. Focal lactic acidosis also causes secondary oedema, oxidative stress, inflammation and white matter damage.

Pathological anatomy

Despite its name, WE is not related to Wernicke's area, a region of the brain associated with speech and language interpretation.

In most, early lesions completely reversed with immediate and adequate supplementation.

Lesions are usually symmetrical in the periventricular region, diencephalon, the midbrain, hypothalamus, and cerebellar vermis. Brainstem lesions may include cranial nerve III, IV, VI and VIII nuclei, the medial thalamic nuclei, and the dorsal nucleus of the vagus nerve. Oedema may be found in the regions surrounding the third ventricle, and fourth ventricle, also appearing petechiae and small hemorrhages. Chronic cases can present the atrophy of the mammillary bodies.

Endothelial proliferation, hyperplasia of capillaries, demyelination and neuronal loss can also occur.

An altered blood–brain barrier may cause a perturbed response to certain drugs and foods.

Diagnosis 
Diagnosis of Wernicke encephalopathy or disease is made clinically.  Caine et al. in 1997 established criteria that Wernicke encephalopathy can be diagnosed in any patient with just two or more of the main symptoms noted above. The sensitivity of the diagnosis by the classic triad was 23% but increased to 85% taking two or more of the four classic features. These criteria are challenged because all the cases he studied were people who drank excessive amounts of alcohol. Some consider it sufficient to suspect the presence of the disease with only one of the principal symptoms. Some British hospital protocols suspect WE with any one of these symptoms: confusion, decreased consciousness level (or unconsciousness, stupor or coma), memory loss, ataxia or unsteadiness, ophthalmoplegia or nystagmus, and unexplained hypotension with hypothermia. The presence of only one sign should be sufficient for treatment.

As a much more diverse range of symptoms has been found frequently in patients it is necessary to search for new diagnostic criteria, however Wernicke encephalopathy remains a clinically-diagnosed condition. Neither the MR, nor serum measurements related to thiamine are sufficient diagnostic markers in all cases. However, as described by Zuccoli et al. in several papers the involvement of the cranial nerve nuclei and central gray matter on MRI, is very specific to WE in the appropriate clinical setting. Non-recovery upon supplementation with thiamine is inconclusive.

The sensitivity of MR was 53% and the specificity was 93%. The reversible cytotoxic edema was considered the most characteristic lesion of WE. The location of the lesions were more frequently atypical among people who drank appropriate amounts of alcohol, while typical contrast enhancement in the thalamus and the mammillary bodies was observed frequently associated with alcohol misuse. These abnormalities may include:
 Dorsomedial thalami, periaqueductal gray matter, mamillary bodies, tectal plate and brainstem nuclei are commonly affected. Involvement is always bilateral and symmetric. Value of DWI in the diagnosis of WE is minimal. Axial FLAIR MRI images represent the best diagnostic MRI sequence. Contrast material may highlight involvement of the mamillary bodies.
There appears to be very little value for CT scans.

Thiamine can be measured using an erythrocyte transketolase activity assay, or by activation by measurement of in vitro thiamine diphosphate levels. Normal thiamine levels do not necessarily rule out the presence of WE, as this may be a patient with difficulties in intracellular transport.

Prevention
There are hospital protocols for prevention, supplementing with thiamine in the presence of: history of alcohol misuse or related seizures, requirement for IV glucose, signs of malnutrition, poor diet, recent diarrhea or vomiting, peripheral neuropathy, intercurrent illness, delirium tremens or treatment for DTs, and others. 

Some experts advise parenteral thiamine should be given to all at-risk patients in the emergency department.

In the clinical diagnosis should be remembered that early symptoms are nonspecific, and it has been stated that WE may present nonspecific findings. There is consensus to provide water-soluble vitamins and minerals after gastric operations.

In some countries certain foods have been supplemented with thiamine, and have reduced WE cases. Improvement is difficult to quantify because they applied several different actions. Avoiding or moderating alcohol consumption and having adequate nutrition reduces one of the main risk factors in developing Wernicke-Korsakoff syndrome..

Treatment
Most symptoms will improve quickly if deficiencies are treated early. Memory disorder may be permanent.

In patients suspected of WE, thiamine treatment should be started immediately. Blood should be immediately taken to test for thiamine, other vitamins and minerals levels. Following this an immediate intravenous or intramuscular dose of thiamine should be administered two or three times daily. Thiamine administration is usually continued until clinical improvement ceases.

Considering the diversity of possible causes and several surprising symptomatologic presentations, and because there is low assumed risk of toxicity of thiamine, because the therapeutic response is often dramatic from the first day, some qualified authors indicate parenteral thiamine if WE is suspected, both as a resource for diagnosis and treatment. The diagnosis is highly supported by the response to parenteral thiamine, but is not sufficient to be excluded by the lack of it. Parenteral thiamine administration is associated with a very small risk of anaphylaxis.

People who consume excessive amounts of alcohol may have poor dietary intakes of several vitamins, and impaired thiamine absorption, metabolism, and storage; they may thus require higher doses.

If glucose is given, such as in people with an alcohol use disorder who are also hypoglycaemic, thiamine must be given concurrently. If this is not done, the glucose will rapidly consume the remaining thiamine reserves, exacerbating this condition.

The observation of edema in MR, and also the finding of inflation and macrophages in necropsied tissues, has led to successful administration of antiinflammatories.

Other nutritional abnormalities should also be looked for, as they may be exacerbating the disease. In particular, magnesium, a cofactor of transketolase which may induce or aggravate the disease.

Other supplements may also be needed, including: cobalamin, ascorbic acid, folic acid, nicotinamide, zinc, phosphorus (dicalcium phosphate) and in some cases taurine, especially suitable when there cardiocirculatory impairment.
Patient-guided nutrition is suggested. In patients with Wernicke-Korsakoff syndrome, even higher doses of parenteral thiamine are recommended. Concurrent toxic effects of alcohol should also be considered.

Epidemiology
There are no conclusive statistical studies, all figures are based on partial studies.

Wernicke's lesions were observed in 0.8 to 2.8% of the general population autopsies, and 12.5% of people with an alcohol use disorder. This figure increases to 35% of such individuals if including cerebellar damage due to lack of thiamine.

Most autopsy cases were from people with an alcohol use disorder. Autopsy series were performed in hospitals on the material available which is unlikely to be representative of the entire population. Considering the slight affectations, previous to the generation of observable lesions at necropsy, the percentage should be higher. There is evidence to indicate that Wernicke encephalopathy is underdiagnosed. For example, in one 1986 study, 80% of cases were diagnosed postmortem. Is estimated that only 5–14% of patients with WE are diagnosed in life.

In a series of autopsy studies held in Recife, Brazil, it was found that only 7 out of 36 had consumed excessive amounts of alcohol, and only a small minority had malnutrition.  In a reviewed of 53 published case reports from 2001 to 2011, the relationship with alcohol was also about 20% (10 out of 53 cases).

WE is more likely to occur in males than females. Among the minority who are diagnosed, mortality can reach 17%. The main factors triggering death are thought to be infections and liver dysfunctions.

History
WE was first identified in 1881 by the German neurologist Carl Wernicke, although the link with thiamine was not identified until the 1930s. A similar presentation of this disease was described by the Russian psychiatrist Sergei Korsakoff in a series of articles published 1887–1891;  where the chronic version of WE was described as Korsakoff's Syndrome, involving symptoms of amnesia.

References

External links 

Alcohol and health
Malnutrition
Central nervous system disorders
Vitamin deficiencies
Thiamine
Medical triads